The Northern Division of the Queensland Rugby League is responsible for administering the game of rugby league in North Queensland, specifically in the area from Sarina in the south to Cape York and the Torres Strait Islands in the north and west to Mount Isa as well as into the Gulf Communities. There are over 8000 registered players across 36 senior clubs and 39 junior clubs in this division. 
The Northern Division is responsible for the historic Foley Shield competition that is held each year. Mid West and Mount Isa play in the Toyota Outback Carnival.

Team of the Century
In 2008, the centennial year of rugby league football in Australia, the Northern Division named its team of the century:
1. Ray Laird (Mackay, NQ, Qld, Aus)   
2. Kerry Boustead (Innisfail, NQ, Qld, Aus)   
3. Alan Gill (Cairns, NQ, Qld, Aus)   
4. Gary Wellington (Burdekin, Herbert River, Qld, Aus)   
5. Dale Shearer (Sarina, NQ, Qld, Aus)   
6. Bob Banks (Charters Towers, Tully, Cairns, NQ, Qld, Aus)   
7. Arch Foley (Townsville, NQ, Qld – career cut short by World War I)   
8. Martin Bella (Sarina, NQ, Qld, Aus)   
9. Brian Fitzsimons (Cairns, Ayr, Qld, Aus)   
10. Dan Clifford (Tully, NQ, Qld)   
11. Jim Paterson (Townsville, Innisfail, Herbert River, NQ, Qld, Aus)   
12. Angelo Crema (Tully, NQ, Qld, Aus)   
13. Kel O'Shea (Ayr, Qld, NSW, Aus)   
Reserves:   
14. Lionel Williamson (Innisfail, NQ, Qld, Aus)
15. Matt Bowen (NQ Cowboys, Qld, Aus)   
16. Marshall Colwell (Mackay, Townsville, NQ, Qld)   
17. Greg Dowling (Herbert River, Innisfail, NQ, Qld, Aus)

Cairns District Rugby League

Seniors
The C.D.R.L (the Marlins) is the governing body for the Cairns eleven club senior competition, which has three grades: A-grade, reserves and colts (under 18's).
All finals matches are played at Barlow Park.
Cairns is represented in the Queensland Cup and Mal Meninga Cup (Under 18's) state leagues by the Northern Pride.

Juniors
The Cairns District Junior Rugby League (the Crocodiles) runs a twelve club junior competitions with grades ranging from under 6's to under 16's.
Cairns' juniors compete in the Cyril Connell Cup state league as the Northern Pride.

Eacham Junior Rugby League 
Eacham Junior Rugby League is the governing body for seven club junior rugby league on the Atherton Tablelands. The home grounds of Eacham Junior Rugby League are the Atherton Junior Rugby League grounds. The name of the Eacham Junior Rugby League comes from a senior competition dating back to the early twentieth which comprised senior clubs from Mareeba, Atherton, Malanda and Millaa Millaa. As of 2021 the Only remaining teams in the Eacham Junior League are, Ravenshoe, Herberton, Malanda and Atherton. With Cooktown in their own competition, Kuranda being defunct and Mareeba going back into the Cairns District Junior League.

Innisfail Junior Rugby League 
Former 4 team competition based around Innisfail now part of the CDJRL.

Mackay & District Rugby League

Senior clubs
The Mackay & District Rugby League (the Sea Eagles) runs an eight club senior competition of three grades, A-Grade, reserve grade and colts (under 18's) and selects representative sides also represented in the Queensland Cup and Mal Meninga Cup (Under 18's) state leagues by the Mackay Cutters.

Juniors 
The Mackay Junior Rugby League (the Junior Sea Eagles) runs a nine club juniors competitions with grades ranging from under 6's to under 16's.
Mackay's juniors competed in the Cyril Connell Cup state league as the Mackay Cutters.

Townsville & District Rugby League

Seniors
The Townsville & District Rugby League runs an Eight club senior competition of three grades: A-Grade, reserve grade, under 19's and colts (under 18's) and selects representative teams to compete in the yearly Foley Shield and Mal Meninga Cup (Under 18's) state league as the Townsville Stingers/Townsville Blackhawks.

Juniors

The Townsville & District Junior Rugby League (the Kangaroos) runs a ten club juniors competitions with grades ranging from under 6's to under 16's.
Townsville's juniors competed in the Cyril Connell Cup state league formerly as the Townsville Stingers, but now go by Mendi Townsville & Districts Blackhawks.

The TDJRL clubs are shown below.

Mount Isa Rugby League

Remote Areas Rugby League

Major Venues 

 Barlow Park - Cairns (18,000 / 3,750 Grandstand seating)
 BB Print Stadium - Mackay (12,000 / 1,050 Grandstand seating)
 Jack Manski Oval - Townsville (4,000 / 250 Grandstand seating)
 Queensland Country Bank Stadium - Townsville (25,000 / 25,000 Grandstand seating)

See also

Rugby league in Queensland

References

External links

Queensland Rugby League
North Queensland
Far North Queensland
Gulf of Carpentaria
North West Queensland